This is an incomplete list of professional racing cyclists, sorted alphabetically by decade in which they won their first major race.

Cyclists by country

  List of British cyclists
  List of Dutch cyclists

Cyclists by decade

Of the 1880s
 Frank Bowden
 Thomas Stevens
 Alfred Tipper

Of the 1890s

 Georgios Aspiotis
 Edward Battell
 Hélène Dutrieu
 Léon Flameng
 August von Gödrich
 Bert Harris
 Miltiades Iatrou
 Georgios Koletis
 Aristidis Konstantinidis
 Konstantinos Konstantinou
 Charles "Mile-a-Minute" Murphy was the first man ever to ride a bicycle for one mile in less than a minute. He performed this feat in 1899 by drafting behind a Long Island Rail Road boxcar between Farmingdale and Babylon on Long Island.
 Dora Rinehart
 Major Taylor (26 November 1878 – 21 June 1932) was an American cyclist who won the world 1 mile (1.6 km) track cycling championship in 1899 after setting numerous world records and overcoming racial discrimination. Taylor was the first African-American athlete to achieve the level of world champion and only the second black man to win a world championship—after Canadian boxer George Dixon.
 Frank E. Weaver

Of the 1900s

 Aloïs Catteau
 Henri Cornet
 Thorvald Ellegaard
 Maurice Garin
 Marie Marvingt
 Ernest Payne
 Lucien Petit-Breton
 René Pottier

Of the 1910s

 Jean Alavoine
 Marcel Buysse
 Eugène Christophe
 Oscar Egg
 Frederick Grubb
 Firmin Lambot
 Rudolph "Okey" Lewis
 Henri Pélissier
 Fritz Schallwig (1890–1916), champion German cyclist. He was born on 7 May 1890 in Spandau in Berlin, Germany and was killed in World War I.
 Carl Schutte 
 Philippe Thys

Of the 1920s

 Honoré Barthélémy
 Alfredo Binda
 Ottavio Bottecchia
 Lucien Buysse
 Giovanni Brunero
 Tullio Campagnolo
 Fernand Canteloube
 Gösta Carlsson
 Michael Collins
 Maurice De Waele
 Nicolas Frantz
 Costante Girardengo
 René Hamel
 Hector Heusghem
 Henri Hoevenaers
 Lucien Michard
 Piet Moeskops
 Henri Pélissier
 Léon Scieur
 Félix Sellier
 Frank Southall
 Harry Stenqvist
 Alfonsina Strada

Of the 1930s

 Gino Bartali
 Charles Holland
 Roger Lapébie
 Leonard Maffei
 Jef Scherens
 Kurt Stöpel
 Lucien Vlaemynck

Of the 1940s

 Gino Bartali
 Pierre Brambilla
 Fausto Coppi
 Édouard Fachleitner
 Reg Harris
 Guy Lapébie
 Fiorenzo Magni
 André Mahé
 Jacques Marinelli
 Jean Robic
 Briek Schotte
 Gerrit Voorting
 Eileen Sheridan

Of the 1950s

 Federico Bahamontes
 Ercole Baldini
 Louison Bobet
 Ray Booty
 Fausto Coppi
 Wim van Est
 Charly Gaul
 Raphaël Géminiani
 Hugo Koblet
 Ferdy Kübler
 Lucien Lazaridès
 Fiorenzo Magni
 Antonio Maspes
 Stan Ockers
 Rik Van Looy
 Gerrit Voorting
 Roger Walkowiak
 Eileen Sheridan
 Galina Yermolayeva

Of the 1960s

 Lucien Aimar
 Jacques Anquetil
 Beryl Burton
 Evert Dolman
 Seamus Elliott
 Felice Gimondi
 Barry Hoban
 Jan Janssen
 Jean-Marie Leblanc
 Daniel Morelon
 Raymond Poulidor
 Tom Simpson
 Galina Tsareva
 Michael Wright
 Bart Zoet

Of the 1970s

 Alf Engers
 Erik De Vlaeminck
 Roger De Vlaeminck
 Gary Fisher
 Cyrille Guimard
 Lutz Hesslich
 Bernard Hinault
 John Howard
 Freddy Maertens
 Eddy Merckx
 Francesco Moser
 Koichi Nakano
 Walter Planckaert
 Jan Raas
 Martín Emilio Rodríguez
 Bernard Thévenet
 Lothar Thoms
 Lucien Van Impe

Of the 1980s

 Frankie Andreu
 Pedro Delgado
 Laurent Fignon
 Todd Gogulski
 Andrew Hampsten
 Luis Herrera
 Michael Hübner
 Sean Kelly
 Greg LeMond
 Jeannie Longo
 Bob Mionske
 Connie Paraskevin
 Fabio Parra
 Davis Phinney
 Walter Planckaert
 Stephen Roche
 Bob Roll
 Erika Salumäe
 Giuseppe Saronni
 Rebecca Twigg
 Eric Vanderaerden

Of the 1990s

 Djamolidine Abdoujaparov
 Niki Aebersold
 Frankie Andreu
 Lance Armstrong
 Félicia Ballanger
 Michele Bartoli
 Joseba Beloki
 Chris Boardman
 Johan Bruyneel
 Francesco Casagrande
 Fabio Casartelli
 Ángel Casero
 Mario Cipollini
 Ludo Dierckxsens
 Jens Fiedler
 Fernando Escartín
 Laurent Gané
 Niki Gudex
 Tyler Hamilton
 Roger Hammond
 George Hincapie
 Tristan Hoffman
 Miguel Induráin
 Laurent Jalabert
 Shane Kelly
 Kevin Livingston
 Olaf Ludwig
 Bob Mionske
 Christophe Moreau
 Graeme Obree
 Abraham Olano
 Marco Pantani
 Bjarne Riis
 Fred Rompelberg
 Florian Rousseau
 Marco Serpellini
 Marla Streb
 Rolf Sørensen
 Andrea Tafi
 Pavel Tonkov
 Arnaud Tournant
 Rebecca Twigg
 Jan Ullrich
 Kathy Watt
 Diana Žiliūtė

Of the 2000s

 Kristin Armstrong
 Lance Armstrong (now stripped of Tour de France medals)
 Judith Arndt
 Emilie Aubry
 Dede Barry
 Ivan Basso
 Grégory Baugé
 Mark Beaumont
 Lyne Bessette
 Paolo Bettini
 Michael Boogerd
 Tom Boonen
 Santiago Botero
 Fabian Cancellara
 Sara Carrigan**
 Mark Cavendish
 Alberto Contador
 Nicole Cooke
 Katheryn Curi
 Gunn-Rita Dahle
 Tom Danielson
 Mike Day
 Ellen van Dijk (NED), multiple road and track world champion
 Alex Dowsett
 Alison Dunlap
 Chris Eatough
 Cadel Evans
 Niki Gudex
 Liz Hatch
 George Hincapie
 Chris Horner
 Chris Hoy
 Thor Hushovd
 Timothy Jones
 Bobby Julich
 Jill Kintner
 Andreas Klöden
 Floyd Landis
 Levi Leipheimer
 Danny MacAskill
 Kaarle McCulloch
 Anna Meares
 Axel Merckx
 Rune Monstad
 Johan Museeuw
 Andris Naudužs
 Manfred Nepp
 Stefan Nimke
 Adrien Niyonshuti
 Stuart O'Grady
 Joseph M. Papp
 Victoria Pendleton
 Taylor Phinney
 Jeremy Powers
 Jennie Reed
 Mark Renshaw
 Donny Robinson
 Peter Sagan
 Andy Schleck
 Fränk Schleck
 Alexandr Shefer
 Marla Streb
 Jan Ullrich
 Sarah Ulmer
 Rigoberto Urán
 Alejandro Valverde
 Tejay van Garderen
 Jonathan Vaughters
 Alexander Vinokourov
 Richard Virenque
 Jens Voigt
 Marianne Vos
 Sam Whittingham
 Bradley Wiggins
 Erik Zabel
 David Zabriskie
 Leontien Zijlaard-Van Moorsel
 Grant Potter

Of the 2010s

 Julian Alaphilippe
 Matthijs Büchli
 Chris Froome
 Jeffrey Hoogland
 Harrie Lavreysen
 François Pervis
 Nairo Quintana
 Primož Roglič
 Geraint Thomas
 Kristina Vogel
 Miriam Welte
 Adam Yates

Of the 2020s

 João Almeida
 Wout van Aert
 Egan Bernal
 Remco Evenepoel
 Tadej Pogačar
 Mathieu van der Poel

See also

Cycling at the 2008 Summer Olympics
Former Team CSC staff, from 1998 to present.
Madonna del Ghisallo, patroness of cyclists.
Tour of Britain
Giro d'Italia
Tour de France
Vuelta a España
List of racing cyclists and pacemakers with a cycling-related death

References

 

eu:Txirrindularitza